José Cándido Alejandrino y Magdangal (December 1, 1870 – June 1, 1951) was a Philippine Republican Army general during the Philippine Revolution and the Philippine–American War.

He was also a senator from the Twelfth Senatorial District of the Philippines.

Early life
Alejandrino was born to a wealthy family from Arayat, Pampanga, on December 1, 1870 in Manila. He initially studied at the Ateneo Municipal de Manila, and his contemporaries there included José Rizal, Juan Araneta, Cayetano Arellano, and Apolinario Mabini, among others. He acquired his Bachelor of Arts degree at the University of Santo Tomas, and pursued studies in Spain and at the University of Ghent, where he graduated with a degree in chemical engineering.

Propaganda Movement
While in Spain, he was one of the members of the Propaganda Movement which demanded equality, especially equal opportunities in the colonial administration, for Spaniards and Filipinos. He was also a contributor to La Solidaridad, an organization composed of Filipino liberals living abroad since 1872, mostly attending different universities across Europe. The group aimed to increase Spanish awareness of the needs of its colony, the Philippines, and to foster a closer relationship between the archipelago and Spain. Alejandrino helped José Rizal in correcting errors in the El filibusterismo, which was published in Ghent, Belgium. He also helped distribute copies of the said manuscript.

When Aguinaldo accepted the offer, Alejandrino proceeded to Hong Kong, where he helped organise the Consejo Revolucionario along with Felipe Agoncillo, José Maria Basa and Mariano Ponce. Later, he became part of the group in the Hong Kong Committee, which included Agoncillo and Galicano Apacible, who was the head of La solidaridad, which advocated Philippines independence, as opposed to the circle led by Basa and Doroteo Cortes, who were for annexation by the United States. In February 1897, Alejandrino went to Japan in hopes of acquiring more weapons for the revolutionaries. He was with Aguinaldo when the latter was exiled to Hong Kong in accordance to the Pact of Biak-na-Bato, which was signed on December 14, 1897.

Philippine–American War and postwar life

In 1898, Alejandrino served in the Malolos Congress, becoming a member of the two committees that drafted the Malolos Constitution. On 26 September, he was given the post of Director of Agriculture, Industry and Commerce. Later, Aguinaldo designated Alejandrino Chief of the engineers of the Army, and he directed the building of trenches in several areas, including Bulacan and Caloocan.

Alejandrino and his friend, General Antonio Luna, suggested to President Emilio Aguinaldo that they build a defensive line from Novaliches to Caloocan to delay the northward advance of American troops intent on capturing the railway. This was however not implemented, as General Luna was murdered by troops loyal to Aguinaldo. The president was later captured and unconditionally surrendered  to General Frederick Funston on April 29, 1901. On April 12, 1901, Alejandrino married Adela Chuidian, daughter of the reformist Telesforo Chuidian. In August of the same year, Alejandrino accepted an offer to serve as the second city engineer of Manila. In 1925, Governor-General Leonard Wood made him senator of the Twelfth Senatorial District of the Philippines. He died on June 1, 1951.

Written works
 La Senda del Sacrificio (1949)

Media portrayals
 Portrayed by Alvin Anson in the film, Heneral Luna (2015), and its sequel, Goyo: Ang Batang Heneral (2018).

References

1870 births
1951 deaths
Filipino Freemasons
Filipino generals
Filipino propagandists
People of the Philippine–American War
People of the Philippine Revolution
Senators of the 7th Philippine Legislature
Kapampangan people
Governors of Pampanga
People from Pampanga
People from Manila
Nacionalista Party politicians
Secretaries of Agriculture of the Philippines
Aguinaldo administration cabinet members
University of Santo Tomas alumni
Ghent University alumni
Members of the Malolos Congress